Deh Pish-e Olya (also Romanized as Deh Pīsh-e ‘Olyā; also known as Deh Pīsh and Deh Pīsh-e Bālā) is a village in Nakhlestan Rural District, in the Central District of Kahnuj County, Kerman Province, Iran. At the 2006 census, its population was 576, in 107 families.

References 

Populated places in Kahnuj County